Anthony S. Seminerio (February 15, 1935 – January 6, 2011) was an American politician from New York.

Life
Seminerio graduated from the New York Institute of Technology with a Bachelor's degree. Then he became a corrections officer. He was an executive board member representing the Correction Officers' Benevolent Association where he engaged in negotiations that forced him to travel between New York City and the state capital of Albany, New York. In addition to being the collective bargaining negotiator for members of the Dept. of Corrections Seminerio also served as the founder and treasurer of the New York State Peace Officers Association.

He was a member of the New York State Assembly from 1979 to 2009, sitting in the 183rd, 184th, 185th, 186th, 187th, 188th, 189th, 190th, 191st, 192nd, 193rd, 194th, 195th, 196th, 197th and 198th New York State Legislatures. He represented the neighborhoods of Richmond Hill, Queens and Glendale, Queens. As a member of the New York Assembly, he was one of the more conservative members of the New York City delegation. He opposed abortions, supported capital punishment, and took a tough stance on crime. Thus often at odds with Speaker Sheldon Silver, he endorsed several prominent Republican candidates in the past, including Rudy Giuliani, George Pataki, and Al D'Amato.

He resigned on June 23, 2009, following an indictment for alleged Honest services fraud delivered by the U.S. Attorney for the Southern District of New York. In June 2009, he pleaded guilty to taking large sums of money from hospitals through a consulting firm while still a member of the New York State Assembly. He died on January 6, 2011, while serving a prison term in the Federal Correctional Complex, Butner in Butner, North Carolina. His appeal was never heard but his conviction was abated due to his death.

References

External links
 The Man Who Couldn't Be Judge
 Academic Rights for the Empire State?
 Criminal Charges
 Notice of death

1935 births
2011 deaths
Democratic Party members of the New York State Assembly
Politicians convicted of honest services fraud
Prisoners who died in United States federal government detention
People from Queens, New York
New York Institute of Technology alumni
New York (state) politicians convicted of crimes
American trade union leaders
Leaders of organizations
New York City Department of Correction